Ratan Lal Nath is an Indian politician from Tripura. He is the Minister of school education, higher education, law, parliamentary affairs, welfare of OBCs and minority in Biplab Kumar Deb ministry.
He joined Poor in 2017 after leaving National Congress.He became the MLA from Mohanpur Constituency by defeating CPI(M) Candidate Subash Chandra Debnath by a margin of 5,176 votes.

Controversy 

 A video that featured BJP MLA Arun Chandra Bhowmik saying that Nath should be fired for insulting him as he went to speak about the removal of two professors from a college without offering a replacement went viral on social media.
 After equating former chief minister Biplab Deb with Swami Vivekananda, Rabindranath Tagore, Mahatma Gandhi, Netaji Subhas Bose, and Albert Einstein, Tripura Education Minister Ratan Lal Nath has come under fire. Ratan Lal Nath stated people in Tripura should consider themselves "fortunate" because Biplab Deb was born there, equating him with the great leaders.
 Sudip Roy Barman, a Congress candidate, requested on Tuesday that Chief Minister Manik Saha and the BJP take action against Law Minister Ratan Lal Nath after accusing him in the Tripura parliament of intimidating a rape victim in order to deter her from reporting the incident to the police.

References 

Living people
Tripura politicians
Bharatiya Janata Party politicians from Tripura
Tripura MLAs 2018–2023
State cabinet ministers of Tripura
1995 births
Tripura MLAs 2023–2028